Bryan Leininger is a former US National Champion in judo. He competed in the Olympic festival as a preliminary to the Olympic trials in 1991.He typically competed in the over 209lbs division.

Judo 

He was a national champion and a long time member of the US team. Leininger won a gold medal in the 1996 US National Championships in San Jose, California.

He is the brother of Christophe Leininger as part of the "Flying Leininger Brothers". They studied judo under Hayward Nishioka at Los Angeles City College, with their father Maurice Leininger. They additionally trained with the French national judo team. Bryan Leininger won at the Colorado State Championships, the US National Collegiate and French National Collegiate championships.   He also won medals six times in the US National Championships. In 1994, Leininger won the United States Judo Association award for most improved competitor. He placed second in the 2001 World Masters Judo Championships.

References

American male judoka
Living people
French male judoka
Year of birth missing (living people)